Lawrence Cunningham may refer to:

People
 Lawrence Cunningham (cricketer) (born 1965), Jamaican cricketer
 Lawrence A. Cunningham (born 1962), American scholar
 Lawrence E. Cunningham (1852–1924), American politician

Fictional characters
 Lawrence Cunningham (Coronation Street)

See also
 Laurie Cunningham (Laurence Cunningham, 1956–1989), English footballer